Étienne Chéret (25 July 1886 – 14 April 1967) was a French cyclist. He competed in two events at the 1912 Summer Olympics.

References

External links
 

1886 births
1967 deaths
French male cyclists
Olympic cyclists of France
Cyclists at the 1912 Summer Olympics
Sportspeople from Neuilly-sur-Seine
Cyclists from Île-de-France